William Proctor House  is a historic home located in Liberty Township, Crawford County, Indiana.  It was built about 1832, and is a two-story, three bay, Federal style brick dwelling.  It has a gable roof with end chimneys.  The house has later rear additions.  The property is owned by the Crawford County Historical Society.

It was listed on the National Register of Historic Places in 2013.

References

Houses on the National Register of Historic Places in Indiana
Federal architecture in Indiana
Houses completed in 1832
Buildings and structures in Crawford County, Indiana
National Register of Historic Places in Crawford County, Indiana